Michael A. Sussmann (born 1964) is an American former federal prosecutor and a former partner at the law firm Perkins Coie, who focused on privacy and cybersecurity law. Sussmann represented the Democratic National Committee (DNC) and retained CrowdStrike to examine its servers after two Russian hacker groups penetrated DNC networks and stole information during the 2016 U.S. elections.

The Trump administration appointed John Durham as special counsel to investigate the origins of the FBI probe into links between Trump associates and Russian officials. Durham spent three years on the investigation and, in 2021, brought a single charge of making false statements against Sussmann, accusing him of having lied to the FBI in one meeting in 2016, with no witnesses. Sussman pleaded not guilty. After a jury trial in May 2022, Sussman was unanimously acquitted.

Early life and education 
Sussmann grew up in New Jersey, and attended Rutgers University and then Brooklyn Law School.

Professional career 
Sussmann began his career as an associate at the law firm Proskauer Rose. He went on to work for twelve years as a prosecutor at the U.S. Justice Department, eventually specializing in computer crimes. He was a special assistant in the United States Department of Justice Criminal Division, and was later appointed as senior counsel. He worked as an assistant U.S. attorney for the Eastern District of Virginia, where he focused on white-collar and violent crime. He worked for Perkins Coie from 2005, where he was a partner in its privacy and cybersecurity practice, until his resignation in September 2021.

Response to Russian cyber attacks on DNC 

On April 28, 2016, DNC CEO Amy Dacy informed Sussmann of a data breach. Sussmann then contacted Shawn Henry, CSO and President of CrowdStrike Services. CrowdStrike discovered that two Russian hacker groups, working independently of each other, had penetrated DNC networks and stolen information, including opposition research on Trump. Other data security groups and U.S. intelligence confirmed these findings.

Durham inquiry 

Beginning in 2017, president Donald Trump and his allies alleged the FBI investigation, leading to the Mueller investigation, of possible contacts between his associates and Russian officials was a "hoax" or "witch hunt" that was baselessly initiated by his political enemies. In May 2019 attorney general Bill Barr appointed U.S. attorney John Durham to investigate the origins of the FBI investigation. In September 2020 The New York Times reported Durham had expanded the scope of his inquiry to include an examination of how the FBI had investigated the Clinton Foundation, after no basis for prosecution had been found by the FBI or later by John W. Huber, a special investigator appointed by Trump's first attorney general Jeff Sessions. Attorney General William Barr secretly appointed Durham Special Counsel on October 19, 2020. After more than two years of his investigation, Durham had secured one felony indictment against FBI attorney Kevin Clinesmith for altering a government document used to obtain a FISA warrant against Trump campaign associate Carter Page, a charge unrelated to the opening of the FBI's investigation into the Trump campaign.

Durham's grand jury indicted Sussmann in September 2021, alleging he made a false statement to FBI general counsel James Baker during a meeting they had in September 2016. At the meeting, Sussmann presented what he and others believed was evidence of potential communications between computer servers at the Russian Alfa-Bank and the Trump Organization. After Trump became president, the FBI found their claims to be without merit, and they were ignored in the Mueller Report.

The indictment of Sussmann alleges he told Baker he did not represent a client for the purposes of their meeting, when he was actually representing the Hillary Clinton 2016 presidential campaign. Sussman had stated during a 2017 congressional deposition that he sought the meeting with Baker on behalf of an unnamed client, a cybersecurity expert who had analyzed the server communications data. As with the charge against Clinesmith, the charge against Sussmann was unrelated to the opening of the FBI investigation into Trump associates and Russians, which occurred in July 2016, and which was the original basis of Durham's investigation.

During a 2018 congressional deposition, Baker stated, "I don’t remember [Sussmann] specifically saying that he was acting on behalf of a particular client," though the Durham investigation found handwritten notes taken by assistant director of the FBI Counterintelligence Division Bill Priestap which paraphrase Baker telling him after the meeting that Sussmann "said not doing this for any client." The notes also say "Represents DNC, Clinton Foundation, etc.," though they did not say Sussmann told Baker this during the meeting; Baker had also said during his deposition that he was generally familiar with Sussmann's work, as they were friends. The Priestap notes constitute hearsay, and it was not clear if they would be admissible in court as evidence under the hearsay rule.

The New York Times reported Durham had records showing Sussmann had billed the Clinton campaign for certain hours he spent working on the Alfa-Bank matter. His attorneys said he did so because he needed to demonstrate internally that he was engaged in billable work, though the work involved consulting with fellow partner Marc Elias, and the campaign paid a flat monthly fee to Perkins Coie but was not actually charged for those billed hours.

After Sussmann's indictment, The New York Times reported that in addition to analyzing suspicious communications involving a Trump server, Sussmann and analysts he worked with became aware of data from a YotaPhone — a Russian-made smartphone rarely used in the United States — that had accessed networks serving the White House, Trump Tower and a Michigan hospital company, Spectrum Health. Like the Alfa-Bank server, a Spectrum server also communicated with the Trump Organization server. Sussmann notified CIA counterintelligence of the findings in February 2017, but it was not known if they were investigated.

In a December 2021 court filing, Sussmann's attorneys presented portions of two documents provided to them by Durham days earlier which they asserted undermined the indictment. One document was a summary of an interview Durham's investigators conducted with Baker in June 2020 in which he did not say that Sussmann told him he was not there on behalf of any client, but rather that Baker had assumed it and that the issue never came up. A second document was a June 2019 Justice Department inspector general interview with Baker in which he said the Sussmann meeting "related to strange interactions that some number of people that were his clients, who were, he described as I recall it, sort of cybersecurity experts, had found." A Durham prosecutor later asserted that subsequent to his 2019 and 2020 interviews, Baker "affirmed and then re-affirmed his now-clear recollection of the defendant’s false statement" after refreshing his memory with contemporaneous or near-contemporaneous notes.

The New York Times reported that the narrow charge against Sussmann was contained in a 27-page indictment that elaborated on activities of cybersecurity researchers who were not charged, including what their attorneys asserted were selected email excerpts that falsely portrayed them as not actually believing their claims. Trump and his supporters seized on that information to assert the Alfa-Bank matter was a hoax devised by Clinton supporters and so the Trump–Russia investigation had been unjustified. Sussmann's attorneys told the court that the new evidence "underscores the baseless and unprecedented nature of this indictment" and asked that his trial date be moved from July to May 2022.

A February 11 conflict of interest motion has given rise to media assumptions and speculation about a variety of facts which the prosecution states will be argued at trial.

In a February 2022 court motion related to Sussmann's prosecution, Durham alleged that Sussmann associate Rodney Joffe and his associates had "exploited" capabilities his company had through a pending cybersecurity contract with the Executive Office of the President (EOP) to acquire nonpublic government Domain Name System (DNS) and other data traffic "for the purpose of gathering derogatory information about Donald Trump." Joffe was not charged and his attorney did not immediately comment. After Sussmann's September 2021 indictment, The New York Times reported that in addition to analyzing suspicious communications involving a Trump server, Sussmann and analysts he worked with became aware of data from a YotaPhone — a Russian-made smartphone rarely used in the United States — that had accessed networks serving the White House, Trump Tower and a Michigan hospital company, Spectrum Health. Like the Alfa-Bank server, a Spectrum Health server also communicated with the Trump Organization server. Sussmann notified CIA counterintelligence of the findings in February 2017, but it was not known if they were investigated. Durham alleged in his February 2022 court motion that Sussmann had claimed his information "demonstrated that Trump and/or his associates were using supposedly rare, Russian-made wireless phones in the vicinity of the White House and other locations," but Durham said he found no evidence to support that. Sussmann's attorneys  responded that Durham knew Sussman had not made such a claim to the CIA. Durham alleged Sussmann's data showed a Russian phone provider connection involving the EOP "during the Obama administration and years before Trump took office." Attorneys for an analyst who examined the YotaPhone data said researchers were investigating malware in the White House; a spokesman for Joffe said his client had lawful access under a contract to analyze White House DNS data for potential security threats. The spokesman asserted Joffe's work was in response to hacks of the EOP in 2015 and of the DNC in 2016, as well as YotaPhone queries in proximity to the EOP and the Trump campaign, that raised "serious and legitimate national security concerns about Russian attempts to infiltrate the 2016 election" that was shared with the CIA. Durham asserted that Sussmann bringing his information to the CIA was part of a broader effort to raise the intelligence community's suspicions of Trump's connections to Russia shortly after he took office. Durham did not allege that any eavesdropping of Trump communications content occurred, nor did he assert the Clinton campaign was involved or that the alleged DNS monitoring activity was unlawful or occurred after Trump took office.

Durham's filing triggered a furor among right-wing media outlets, including misinformation about what Durham had alleged, which was challenged by other outlets and lawyers for the involved parties. Fox News falsely reported that Durham claimed Hillary Clinton's campaign had paid a technology company to "infiltrate" White House and Trump Tower servers; that narrative actually came from Trump ally Kash Patel. The Washington Examiner claimed that this all meant there had been spying on Trump's White House office. Charlie Savage of The New York Times disputed these claims and explained that "Mr. Durham's filing never used the word 'infiltrate.' And it never claimed that Mr. Joffe's company was being paid by the Clinton campaign." Sussmann's attorneys  asserted Durham's motion contained falsehoods "intended to further politicize this case, inflame media coverage, and taint the jury pool" as part of a pattern of Durham's behavior since Sussmann's indictment. Durham objected to a motion by Sussmann's attorneys to have the "factual background" section struck from Durham's motion, stating that "If third parties or members of the media have overstated, understated, or otherwise misinterpreted facts contained in the Government’s Motion, that does not in any way undermine the valid reasons for the Government’s inclusion of this information."

Sussmann's attorneys also explained that "Although the Special Counsel implies that in Mr. Sussmann's February 9, 2017 meeting, he provided Agency-2 with (Executive Office of the President) data from after Mr. Trump took office, the Special Counsel is well aware that the data provided to Agency-2 pertained only to the period of time before Mr. Trump took office, when Barack Obama was President," a time period (2015 and 2016) where much investigation of Russian hacks of Democratic Party and White House networks had occurred: "...cybersecurity researchers were 'deeply concerned' to find data suggesting Russian-made YotaPhones were in proximity to the Trump campaign and the White House, so 'prepared a report of their findings, which was subsequently shared with the C.I.A'."

Sussman pleaded not guilty to the charge. His trial began in May 2022.

On May 31, 2022, after hearing two weeks of testimony, the jury quickly and unanimously acquitted Sussmann. In a statement issued after being acquitted, Sussman said: "I told the truth to the F.B.I., and the jury clearly recognized that with their unanimous verdict today. Despite being falsely accused, I am relieved that justice ultimately prevailed in this case." Sussmann's defense team said that their client "should never have been charged in the first place" and referred to the case as "a case of extraordinary prosecutorial overreach". On June 1, 2022, former Attorney General William Barr was interviewed on Fox News about the verdict. According to Ja'han Jones of MSNBC's The ReidOut Blog, he repeated debunked conspiracy theories about the origins of the Russia investigation by stating that the case against Sussmann "crystallized the central role played by the Hillary campaign in launching, as a dirty trick, the whole Russiagate collusion narrative."

The New York Times reported in January 2023 that two prosecutors on Durham's team had argued to him that the evidence against Sussmann was too thin to pursue charges, and that an acquittal would undermine public faith in Durham's investigation and law enforcement. After Durham pursued the prosecution, one of the prosecutors resigned in protest while another left for another job. Durham's prosecution allowed him to make public large amounts of information insinuating involvement of the Hillary Clinton campaign that were not related to Sussman's prosecution on narrow charges. After the Sussmann prosecution failed, Barr stated it "accomplished something far more important" because it "crystallized the central role played by the Hillary campaign in launching as a dirty trick the whole Russiagate collusion narrative and fanning the flames of it."

References

External links 

 United States of America v. Michael A. Sussmann, Indictment, September 16, 2021

1964 births
21st-century American lawyers
Living people